The Naze is a headland on the east coast of England. It is on the coast of Essex just north of Blackwater and projects into the North Sea. This area is south of the double estuary of the River Stour and River Orwell at Harwich and just north of the town of Walton-on-the-Naze. It is also the location of the Naze Tower, an 18th century monument.

The Naze is a peninsula north of the town. It is important for migrating birds and it has a small nature reserve. The marshes of Hamford Water behind the town are also of ornithological interest, with wintering ducks and brent geese. Many bird watchers visit at migration times.

History

The Naze takes its name from Viking raiders or settlers. The place-name "Naze" derives from Old English næss "ness, promontory, headland". In 1722 Daniel Defoe mentions the nearby town Walton calling it "Walton, under the Nase".

The tall brick Naze Tower on the highest point was a light-house, and was built up to its present height in 1796. In the Napoleonic and 1st World Wars it was a naval signal station. In the 2nd World War a Chain Home Low radar station was built on the Naze to track German warships and low-flying aircraft, and extended in 1942 to include the old tower.

(Refs; WO series and AVIA 7 and AIR 26 series files at the National Archives, Kew).

Threats
The Naze is eroding rapidly and threatening the tower and the wildlife. The Naze Protection Society was formed to campaign for erosion controls. The Naze has become popular for school fieldwork into erosion and methods to protect the coast. Protection includes a sea wall, a riprap, groynes and a permeable groyne as well as drainage. Millions of tons of sand have been added to the beach to replenish it and stop the cliff eroding. However, the cliff near Naze Tower is greatly eroded. The cliff is receding fast and within 50 years Naze Tower may have tumbled into the sea like the pill boxes that can be seen on the beach.

References

External links

 The official Walton-on-the-Naze website
 Naze Protection Society
 The Naze Tower

Headlands of England
Sites of Special Scientific Interest in Essex
Coastal environment of Essex
Beaches of Essex
Landforms of Essex
Coastal Essex